Elections to the Madhya Pradesh Legislative Assembly were held in March 1972. These were the elections to the legislative assembly having 296 seats in undivided Madhya Pradesh. The Indian National Congress won a majority of seats and Prakash Chandra Sethi was sworn in as the new Chief Minister.

After the 1962 Madhya Pradesh Legislative Assembly election, the number of constituencies in Madhya Pradesh were increased to 296, following the recommendation of the Delimitation Commission of India.

Results 
Source:

Elected Members

References

1972
1972
Madhya Pradesh